Mademoiselle ma mère (My Mother Is a Miss) is a 1937 French comedy film directed by Henri Decoin, and starring Danielle Darrieux, Pierre Brasseur and Pierre Larquey. The screenplay was written by Jean Boyer, based on a play by Louis Verneuil. The music score is by Georges Van Parys.

It tells the story of a rich young girl who avoids the sex with her older husband and falls in love with her stepson. The film was remade as Novio, marido y amante (1948) in Argentina.

Plot

Jaqueline's father is tired of her free spirit life, and to make things worst she just broke up with her fourteenth fiancé and they argue about it. In order to upset her daddy even more the young lady decided to marry Albert Letournel, a wealthy man who is in his fifties.

References

External links

Mademoiselle ma mère at Le Cinema Francais 

1937 films
1937 comedy films
French black-and-white films
French comedy films
French films based on plays
Films based on works by Louis Verneuil
Films directed by Henri Decoin
1930s French-language films
1930s French films